The 1998 Maryland Terrapins football team represented the University of Maryland in the 1998 NCAA Division I-A football season. In their second season under head coach Ron Vanderlinden, the Terrapins compiled a 3–8 record, finished in a tie for last place in the Atlantic Coast Conference, and were outscored by their opponents 290 to 202. The team's statistical leaders included Ken Mastrole with 632 passing yards, LaMont Jordan with 906 rushing yards, and Jermaine Arrington with 366 receiving yards.

Schedule

References

Maryland
Maryland Terrapins football seasons
Maryland Terrapins football